FC Shakhtar Konotop is a Ukrainian amateur football club from Konotop, Sumy Oblast. It plays in the Sumy Oblast Championship (season 2018–19).

League and cup history

{|class="wikitable"
|-bgcolor="#efefef"
! Season
! Div.
! Pos.
! Pl.
! W
! D
! L
! GS
! GA
! P
!Domestic Cup
!colspan=2|Europe
!Notes
|}

 
Football clubs in Sumy Oblast
Amateur football clubs in Ukraine
Konotop
Association football clubs established in 1953
1953 establishments in Ukraine